A quarry is a type of mine, usually open-cast, generally for the extraction of stone such as for building or fossil fuel.

Quarry or Quarries may also refer to:
 The subject of any pursuit, especially game being hunted

Arts and entertainment

Film and television 

 Quarry (TV series), based on Max Allan Collins' novels
 "Quarry" (Law & Order: Special Victims Unit), episode 13 of season 6
 The Quarry (1998 film), a Belgian film
 The Quarry (2020 film), an American film

Literature 
 Quarry (novel), a 2011 novel by Ally Kennen
 Quarry, a series of novels by Max Allan Collins
 The Quarry (Banks novel), a 2013 novel by Iain Banks
 The Quarry (Dürrenmatt novel) or Suspicion, a 1951 novel by Friedrich Dürrenmatt
 The Quarry, a novel by Charles W. Chesnutt written in 1928 and published in 1999
 The Quarry, a 2006 novel by Damon Galgut
 The Quarry, a 1947 novel by Mildred Walker

Other media 

 The Quarry (painting), an 1857 painting by Gustave Courbet
 The Quarry (video game), a 2022 horror video game

Places
 Quarries (biblical), limestone quarries beneath ancient Jerusalem
 Quarries, a neighbourhood in Ottawa, Ontario, Canada, also known as Carson Meadows
 Quarries Reach, a reach of the Brisane River, Queensland, Australia
 Quarry, Newfoundland and Labrador, an abandoned railway community in Newfoundland, Canada
 Quarry, County Westmeath, a townland in Mullingar civil parish, Ireland
 Quarry, Ohio, United States, a ghost town
 Quarry, Texas, United States, an unincorporated community
 The Quarry (park), the main park of Shrewsbury, England
 Quarry Hill, Hong Kong
 Quarry Lake (Nova Scotia), a lake in Halifax, Nova Scotia, Canada
 Quarry Lake (Maryland), a lake in Pikesville, Maryland, United States

Other uses
 Quarry (surname)
 Quarry (company), a marketing communications agency headquartered in St. Jacobs, Ontario

See also
 
 
 Quarry Farm, Elmira, New York, United States, a place where Mark Twain and his family summered for over 20 years
 Quarry Falls, Ontario, Canada
 Quarry Wood (disambiguation)
 Query (disambiguation)